Robert Nolan Gillespie (born November 2, 1979) is an American football coach and former player. Gillespie played in the National Football League (NFL) for two seasons in the early 2000s with the Washington Redskins and Jacksonville Jaguars.  He played college football for the University of Florida.

Early years 

Gillespie was born in Los Angeles, California in 1979.  He attended Hattiesburg High School in Hattiesburg, Mississippi, and he was a standout high school football player for the Hattiesburg Tigers, rushing for 1,957 yards and twenty-six touchdowns, with another 700 yards receiving.  As a senior in 1997, he was a SuperPrep high school All-American.

College career 

Gillespie accepted an athletic scholarship to attend the University of Florida in Gainesville, Florida, where he played for coach Steve Spurrier's Florida Gators football team from 1998 to 2001.  Spurrier would often rotate Gillespie in and out of games with the Gators' other tailback, Earnest Graham, and the two backs shared time at the position.  In four college seasons, he totaled 1,854 yards rushing; he was also a sure-handed receiver out of the Gators' backfield, and became the second all-time Gators running back in career receptions (96) and receiving yards (1,091).  He was a team captain during his senior season in 2001, and the Gators defeated the Maryland Terrapins 56–23 in the Orange Bowl, and finished 10–2 and ranked third in both major polls.

After his professional playing career was over, Gillespie returned to Gainesville and completed his bachelor's degree in exercise and sports science in 2005.

Professional career 

Coaching career

South Carolina
Gillespie started his coaching career as a graduate assistant for the University of South Carolina under Gamecocks head coach Steve Spurrier in 2005, and he was promoted to running backs coach the following season.

Oklahoma State
After four seasons as a Gamecocks assistant, Gillespie accepted an offer to become the new running backs coach for Oklahoma State University under from Cowboys head coach Mike Gundy in January 2009.  In his first season with his new team in 2009, the Cowboys led the Big 12 Conference in rushing offense.

West Virginia
In 2011, Gillespie became the West Virginia Mountaineers running backs coach at West Virginia University.

Tennessee
In 2013 Gillespie was named the running backs coach for the Tennessee Volunteers football until parting ways mid February 2018

North Carolina
In March 2018, Gillespie was named as running backs coach at the University of North Carolina. He coached NFL running backs Antonio Williams, Michael Carter, and Javonte Williams during his tenure as the Tar Heels' RB coach. Carter (2019, 2020) and Javonte Williams (2020) posted 1,000-yard rushing seasons under Gillespie.

Alabama
In January of 2021, Gillespie was named as running backs coach at the University of Alabama replacing Charles Huff, who left to become the head coach at Marshall.

See also 

 Florida Gators football, 1990–99
 List of University of Florida alumni
 List of Washington Redskins players

References

Bibliography 

 Carlson, Norm, University of Florida Football Vault: The History of the Florida Gators, Whitman Publishing, LLC, Atlanta, Georgia (2007).  .
 Golenbock, Peter, Go Gators!  An Oral History of Florida's Pursuit of Gridiron Glory, Legends Publishing, LLC, St. Petersburg, Florida (2002).  .
 Hairston, Jack, Tales from the Gator Swamp: A Collection of the Greatest Gator Stories Ever Told, Sports Publishing, LLC, Champaign, Illinois (2002).  .
 McCarthy, Kevin M., Fightin' Gators: A History of University of Florida Football, Arcadia Publishing, Mount Pleasant, South Carolina (2000).  .

1979 births
Living people
American football running backs
Florida Gators football players
Frankfurt Galaxy players
Jacksonville Jaguars players
Oklahoma State Cowboys football coaches
Sportspeople from Hattiesburg, Mississippi
South Carolina Gamecocks football coaches
Washington Redskins players
West Virginia Mountaineers football coaches
Tennessee Volunteers football coaches
Alabama Crimson Tide football coaches